This is an overview of all elections and referendums held in Iran since the first time in 1906.

List

See also
 Elections in Iran

Notes

References

 
 

 
Iran
Elections